Swann may refer to:

People
Abigail Swann, American atmospheric scientist and ecologist
Alec Swann (born 1976), former English cricketer, brother of Graeme
Anthony Swann (born 1975), Samoan-New Zealand rugby league player
Archie Swann, Scottish footballer
Damian Swann (born 1992), American football player
David Swann (born 1949), Canadian politician
Donald Swann (1923–1994), British composer, musician and entertainer
Edward Swann (1862–1945), New York lawyer
Eric Swann (born 1970), former National Football League player
Frederick Swann (born 1931), American musician
Gary Swann (born 1962), English former footballer 
Graeme Swann (born 1979), English cricketer, brother of Alec
Harry Kirke Swann (1871–1926), British ornithologist
Heather B. Swann (born 1961), Australian contemporary artist
Henry Swann (1763–1824), British Tory politician, Member of Parliament
Herbert Swann (1882–?), British footballer
Ingo Swann (1933–2013), American remote viewer, author, artist
Isaiah Swann (born 1985), American basketball player
James Swann (born 1964), American serial killer
Jeffrey Swann (born 1951), concert pianist
John Swann (pirate) (active 1698–99), English pirate
Julie Swann, American systems engineer
Logan Swann (born 1975), New Zealand rugby league footballer
Lynn Swann (born 1952), former National Football League player, sportscaster and current politician
Matilde Alba Swann (1912–2000), Argentine writer and lawyer
Michael Swann (1920–1990), biologist, chairman of the British Broadcasting Corporation (1973–1980)
Oliver Swann (1878–1948), British naval aviation pioneer and Royal Air Force officer
Pedro Swann (born 1970), American baseball player and coach
Raymond Swann (born 1950), English former cricketer, father of Alec and Graeme
Rich Swann (born 1991), American professional wrestler
Robert Swann (disambiguation), various people
Sidney Swann (1890–1976), English clergyman and rower
Thomas Swann (1809–1883), American politician
William Swann (born 1952), professor of sociology and personality psychology
William Dorsey Swann (1860–1925), American LGBT activist
William Francis Gray Swann (1884–1962), Anglo-American physicist
Willie Swann (born 1977), Samoan-New Zealand rugby league footballer

Characters
Charles Swann, a central character in Marcel Proust's novel sequence In Search of Lost Time (the first volume is Swann's Way)
Elizabeth Swann, in the Pirates of the Caribbean films
Luther Swann, Jess Swann and Dez Swann, characters in V Wars
Mike Swann, a character in the British television soap opera EastEnders
Weatherby Swann, governor of the town of Port Royal in the Pirates of the Caribbean films
Rory Swann, the Hyperion's mechanic in StarCraft II: Wings of Liberty

Other uses
 Swann, West Virginia
 4082 Swann, an asteroid
 Swann (crater), on the far side of the Moon
 Swann: A Mystery, a novel by Carol Shields
 Swann Covered Bridge, a covered bridge in Alabama, United States
 Swann Galleries, a New York auction house
 Un amour de Swann (film) (aka Swann in Love), 1984
 Swann (film), a 1996 Canadian drama film

See also
 Schwann (disambiguation)
 Swan (disambiguation)
 Swan (surname)